

Births and deaths

Births
 Jeannie Robertson (1908–1975)
 Jimmy Shand (1908–2000)
 Ewan MacColl (1915–1989)
 Jane Turriff (1915–2013)
 Roy Williamson (1936–1990)
 Hamish Imlach (1940–1996)
 John Martyn (1948)
 Dick Gaughan (1948)

Collections of songs or music
 1911 "Folk Song in the North-East" by Gavin Greig (1856–1914)
 1930 "Bothy Songs and Ballads" by John Ord

Recordings
 1908 "The Music of Scott Skinner" by Scott Skinner (1843–1927)

Scottish music
20th century in Scotland
1900s in British music
1910s in British music
1920s in British music
1930s in British music
1940s in British music